Harvey Milk Plaza is a transit plaza at the Castro Muni Metro subway station commemorating Harvey Milk, in San Francisco's Castro District, in the U.S. state of California.

History
Harvey Milk, the site's namesake, was a gay man who moved to Castro District of San Francisco in 1972 and went on to become a beloved community activist. In 1977, Milk was elected to the San Francisco Board of Supervisors to represent District 5 (today, District 8), the district in which the plaza stands. Eleven months later, Milk was assassinated in his office at San Francisco City Hall. In response, the community sought to recognize Milk by renaming the above-ground construction related to the Castro Muni Station, which opened in 1980, to be "Harvey Milk Plaza". In 1985, the plaza was officially dedicated to Harvey Milk. In attendance were Mayor Dianne Feinstein, Harvey Milk's successor to the SF Board of Supervisors, Harry Britt, and President of the Board of Supervisors, John Molinari. In 1997, to celebrate the 20th anniversary of Harvey Milk's election to the SF Board of Supervisors, a flagpole dedicated to Milk and the openly LGBTQ+ politicians who followed was added to the site. The flagpole flies the iconic Rainbow Flag designed by SF-based artist Gilbert Baker that has become a world-wide symbol for the LGBTQ+ community. In 2006, photographs from various stages of Milk's life were installed in the plaza and "blessed" by the Sisters of Perpetual Indulgence.

The Castro Muni Station and Harvey Milk Plaza were designed by the architectural firm Reid & Tarics Associates. Howard Grant AIA is reported to have been in charge of design. In 2016, SFMTA announced plans for a large project to increase accessibility for the Castro Muni Station located under the plaza. The announcement led to the formation of The Friends of Harvey Milk Plaza, a group of community members advocating for community involvement in the redesign effort. In 2017, the Friends of Harvey Milk Plaza and the American Institute of Architects (AIASF) launched an international design competition to reimagine the plaza in response to decades of conversation around improving the site to better represent Harvey Milk, who by now had become an internationally recognized LGBT civil rights icon.

In 2017, designs were submitted to renovate the plaza. The winning submission belonged to architecture firm Perkins Eastman who went on to produce some initial design concepts for the project.

In 2019, the Harvey Milk Plaza project secured a $1M grant from the State of California intended to “support construction of LGBTQ space in Harvey Milk Plaza.” In 2021, the Friends of Harvey Milk Plaza announced the selection of landscape architecture firm SWA to serve as the new design lead for the project.

See also

 List of LGBT monuments and memorials

References

1980 establishments in California
Castro District, San Francisco
Harvey Milk
LGBT monuments and memorials in the United States
Monuments and memorials in California
Squares in San Francisco